There It Is may refer to:

 There It Is (film), a 1928 short film starring Charles R. Bowers
 There It Is (911 album), 1999
 There It Is (James Brown album), 1972
 "There It Is" (James Brown song)
 "There It Is" (Ginuwine song), 2001
 "There It Is" (Shalamar song), 1982
 "Whoomp! (There It Is)", a song by Tag Team, 1993